Computer vision dazzle also known as CV dazzle, dazzle makeup, or anti-surveillance makeup, is a type of camouflage used to hamper facial recognition software, inspired by dazzle camouflage used by vehicles such as ships and planes.

Methods 
CV dazzle combines stylized makeup, asymmetric hair, and sometimes infrared lights built in to glasses or clothing to break up detectable facial patterns recognized by computer vision algorithms in much the same way that warships contrasted color and used sloping lines and curves to distort the structure of a vessel. 

It has been shown to be somewhat successful at defeating face detection software in common use, including that employed by Facebook. CV dazzle attempts to block detection by facial recognition technologies such as DeepFace "by creating an 'anti-face'". It uses occlusion, covering certain facial features; transformation, altering the shape or colour of parts of the face; and a combination of the two. Prominent artists employing this technique include Adam Harvey and Jillian Mayer.

Use in protests 
Computer vision dazzle makeup has been used by protesters in several different protest movements.  Its use as a protesting aid has often been found ineffective as it may be effective to thwart computer technology but draws human attention, is easy for human monitors to spot on security cameras, and makes it hard for protesters to blend in within a crowd. Advances in facial recognition technology make dazzle makeup increasingly ineffective.

See also
 Adversarial machine learning

References 

Camouflage
Computer vision